Sonbhadra (also known as Sonebhadra) is the second largest district by area of Uttar Pradesh after Lakhimpur Kheri. It is the only district in India which borders four states, namely Madhya Pradesh to the west, Chhattishgarh to the south, Jharkhand in the south-east and Bihar to the north-east. It lies in the extreme south-east of the state, and is bounded by Mirzapur district to the northwest, Chandauli district to the north, Kaimur and Rohtas districts of Bihar state to the north-east, Garhwa district of Jharkhand state to the east, Balrampur District of Chhattisgarh state to the south, and Singrauli district of Madhya Pradesh state to the west. The district headquarters is in the town of Robertsganj.
Sonbhadra district is an industrial zone and it has much bauxite, limestone, coal, gold, etc. It is called the "Energy Capital of India" because there are multiple power plants.

Sonbhadra lies between Vindhya and Kaimur hills, and its topology and natural environment prompted First Prime Minister of India Jawaharlal Nehru to refer to Sonbhadra as the "Switzerland of India".

In 2018 Uttar Pradesh's chief minister Yogi Adityanath recognised Sonbhadra as a tourist hub in Purvanchal region and further promoted by Uttar Pradesh Tourism Department.

In February 2020, a Press Trust of India (PTI) news report incorrectly claimed that Geological Survey of India (GSI) has found  of gold deposits in Sonbhadra district. PTI later clarified on Twitter that the GSI had told PTI that there had been no such discovery of large gold deposits in the district.

History
The Valley of Son and Belan Rivers abounds in caves which were the earliest dwellings of the primeval inhabitants. This area had been the centre of activities of pre-historic man which is evident from the rock paintings (pre-historic cave art) found in abundance in this region. These paintings are of the periods ranging from Mesolithic to Paleolithic ages.

Based on evidence from religious and cultural perspectives of Ramayana and the Mahabharat, Huyen found here is the cultural symbol. By Jarasandh many rulers in the Mahabharat were maintained prisoner here. Sonbhadra, whose ancient name was Gramputra or Gupt Kashi, was built by the ancient king Putrak for his queen Paatali. It is said that 'Bhars' had settlements along with Chero, Searis and Kharwar communities in the district up to fifth century there was the rule of ''Chandel Rajput'' kings on Vijaygarh Fort. This district was famous as second Kashi during 11th to 13th centuries. In the 9th century B.C., the Brahmadutt dynasty was subdivided by Nagas. Kushan and Nagas also held supremacy over this region before the advent of the Gupta period. After the death of Harshvardhan in the latter half of the 7th century, it remained under the control of the Gurjara-Pratihars till 1025 before they were driven out by Mahmud of Ghazni. This area was under the administration of various Governors of Mughal emperors. Some of the forts such as Agori Fort were under the control of Madan Shah.

During the 18th century, the district came under the control of the Narayan rulers of Benares State, who built or occupied several fortresses in the district. In the decade after 1775, the British took over administrative control of most of the territory of the rajas of Benares. The British district of Mirzapur included present-day Mirzapur and Sonbhadra districts, with all of present-day Sonbhadra district included in Robertsganj tehsil.
On 4 March 1989, Sonbhadra district was divided from Mirzapur district.

The forts located in the district
 Agori Fort
 Vijaygarh Fort
 Sodhrigarh Durg

The heroine of Famous Novel Chandrakanta written by Devaki Nandan Khatri was the princess of Vijaygarh and the daughter of king Jay Singh.

Paragnas of Sonbhadra
Agori Barhar an impartible estate, it originally comprised the present districts of Sonbhadra and part of Mirzapur district. Chandel Rajput Raja Paramardideva of Mahoba, ancestor of the family and contemporary of Raja Prithviraj III of Delhi, who attacked Mahoba as the Raja was the ally of Raja Jaichand of Kannauj, and occupied it for a time. Raja Paramardi Deva fled for his life with his friends and family, and though Mahoba was re-occupied by the Raja with the help of Jaichand of Kannauj, the glory of the capital never returned. During this time one of the sons of Raja Paramardi Deva, called Ashajit, fled eastwards in the turmoil that followed. His sons or grand sons called Barimal and Bharimal, captured Agori from the Kaharwar Raja and made themselves the independent rulers of Agori and Barhar. The elder brother Barimal took the kingdom of Agori and Barhar, and the younger brother Bharimal became the independent ruler of Bardi (Princely state ruled by Chandel -Rajput ruler). Within this zamindari, sixteen talukas have been assigned for the maintenance of the Babus (collateral agnates).

Another Princely state in sonbhadra in Vijaygarh.it was also ruled by Chandel Dynasty after that by Narayan dynasty.

The erstwhile Maharaja is His Highness Raj-Rajeshwar Maharajadhiraja Shri Maharaja Bhuvaneshwar Prasad Singh. His family were the rulers of Singrauli. Their rule extended from Singrauli to Sasaram in Bihar (includes Sonebhadra).

Geography

The northern part of the district lies on a plateau of the Vindhya Range, and is drained by tributaries of the Ganges including the Belan and Karmanasha rivers. South of the steep escarpment of the Kaimur Range is the valley of the Son River, which flows through the district from west to east. The southern portion of the district is hilly, interspersed with fertile stream valleys. The Rihand River, which rises to the south in the highlands of Surguja district of Chhattisgarh, flows north to join the Son in the center of the district. The Govind Ballabh Pant Sagar, a reservoir on the Rihand, lies partly in the district and partly in Madhya Pradesh. East of the Rihand, the Kanhar River, which originates in Chhattisgarh, flows north to join the Son.

The district has historic, cultural, and ecological affinities with the Bagelkhand region. Robertsganj is the district headquarters.

Climate
Sonbhadra has a relatively subtropical climate with high variation between summer and winter temperatures. The weather is pleasant in rainy season from July to October.

Ecology
The portion of the district north of the Son River lies in the Lower Gangetic plains moist deciduous forests ecoregion. The portion south of the Son lies in the Chhota Nagpur dry deciduous forests ecoregion.

Kaimoor Wildlife Sanctuary lies mostly within the district, reaching generally east and west along the spine of the Kaimur Range, and extending to the Son River at its eastern end.

Economy
 
The district has many electrical power stations around Govind Ballabh Pant Sagar. NTPC has two coal-based thermal power plants, being Singrauli Super Thermal Power Station at Shaktinagar and Rihand Thermal Power Station at Rihand Nagar. Other power stations are at Anpara (UPRVUNL), Obra (UPRVUNL), Renusagar (Hindalco) and Pipri-Hydro (UPRVUNL). Northern Coalfields (a branch of Coal India Limited) has its headquarters and many coal mines in this region.

Hindalco has a major aluminium plant at Renukut. Owing to the limestone hills, initially one cement factory was established at Churk in 1956. Another cement factory started at Dala in 1971, with an ancillary unit at Chunar from 1980. A big dam constructed at Pipri in 1961 is named Rihand Dam; another small dam was constructed at Obra in 1968.

The Birla group set up an aluminum plant at Renukut. The company set up its own power plant at Renusagar in 1967 and started a company in Renukut called HiTech Carbon. Another industrial group initiated a company in Renukut named Grasim Industries Limited, which produces chemicals and later it started own power plant at Renukut in 1998.

In 2006 the Ministry of Panchayati Raj named Sonbhadra one of the country's 250 most backward districts (out of a total of 640). It is one of the 34 districts in Uttar Pradesh currently receiving funds from the Backward Regions Grant Fund Programme (BRGF).

Tourist attraction

Historical places

Vijaygarh Fort
Agori Fort
Veer Lorik Patthar
Cave Paintings of Son and Belan Valley, Sonbhadra

Nature
 
Salkhan Fossil Park
Mukkha Fall
Son View Point, Robertsganj
Rihand Dam
Dhanraul Dam
Kaimoor Wildlife Sanctuary

Temples

Shivdwar 
Renukeshwar Mahadev Temple
Vandevi Temple
Jwaladevi Temple, Shaktinagar
Maa Vaishnav Shaktipeeth Dalla
ambedkar park

Transport

By air
Muirpur Airport at Muirpur, an operational airstrip and proposed airport, currently used by chartered and private planes near Renukut 
Varanasi International Airport in Varanasi. Flights are available to all major Indian cities including Delhi, Mumbai, Kolkata, Lucknow, Agra, Bangalore, Chennai, Patna, Khajuraho, Hyderabad, Gaya, etc. International connections are Bangkok, Colombo, Hong Kong and Kathmandu from Varanasi International Airport.

By train
Mirzapur Railway Station
 Sonbhadra Railway Station
Chopan Railway station
Obra Railway station
Renukoot Railway station near Rihand Dam
Anpara Railway station
Singrauli  Railway station
Shaktinagar Railway station
Varanasi Railway station
Dudhi Railway station

The city is connected by rail to Delhi, Allahabad, Ranchi and Patna. Some notable trains passing through the district are Muri express (Jammu Tawi - Delhi - Tata Nagar), Jharkhand Swarna Jayanti Express/12873(Hatia - Kanpur - Delhi), Triveni Express (Bareilly - Lucknow - Shaktinagar/Singrauli/barwadih) Bhopal Express (Bhopal-Howrah) weekly and Shaktipunj Express/11448(Howrah-Bokaro - Chopan- Jabalpur). Intercity Express/03346 (Singrauli- Chopan-Varanasi).

By road
Robertsganj is well connected to Lucknow, Allahabad, Varanasi, Mirzapur, Gorakhpur, Faizabad, Ambikapur Sasaram & Garhwa by road. Buses are available at all hours of the day from Varanasi and it normally takes  hours to cover the distance. The highway connecting Varanasi and Waidhan passes through the district. Though this is not a national highway it is a very busy road because of the towns Dalla, Renukot, Anpara, Shaktinagar which are sufficiently commercialized areas. National Thermal Power corporation is in Shaktinagar and also National Coalfield different projects like Singrauli, Khadia, Jayant, Dudhichua, amlori, Kakri etc. These areas have several major coal mines which cater a big part of the coal need of the state. One of the main reasons this road is always busy is due to daily transport of around 1000 trucks of grits and sand.

Demographics

According to the 2011 census Sonbhadra district has a population of 1,862,559,  of which male and female were 971,344 and 891,215 respectively. roughly equal to the nation of Kosovo or the US state of West Virginia. This gives it a ranking of 254th in India (out of a total of 640). Its population growth rate over the decade 2001-2011 was 27.27%. Scheduled Castes and Scheduled Tribes made up 22.64% and 20.67% of the population respectively.

Sex ratio and child population
Sonbhadra has a sex ratio of 996 females for every 1000 males.
In census enumeration, data regarding child undeg age six were also collected for districts Sonbhadra. There were total 323,092 children under age six against 302,834 of 2001 census. Of total 323,092 male and female were 167,870 and 155,222 respectively. Child sex ratio as per census 2011 was 925 compared to 956 of census 2001. In 2011, children under age six formed 17.35 percent of Sonbhadra District compared to 20.69 percent of 2001. There was net change of -3.34 percent in this compared to previous census.

Literacy rate
literacy rate of 64%. Male and female literacy were 74.92% and 52.14% respectively. Total literate in Sonbhadra District were 985,708 of which male and female were 601,988 and 383,720 respectively.

Language

At the time of the 2011 Census of India, 83.91% of the population in the district spoke Hindi and 14.57% spoke Bhojpuri as their first language. Around 5,000 people in the district speak Gondi and 1,800 Kurukh, both tribal languages.

Sonbhadra District urban population
Out of the total Sonbhadra population for 2011 census, 16.88 percent lives in urban regions of district. In total 314,342 people lives in urban areas of which males are 167,999 and females are 146,343. Sex Ratio in urban region of Sonbhadra district is 871 as per 2011 census data. Similarly child sex ratio in Sonbhadra district was 868 in 2011 census. Child population (0-6) in urban region was 38,169 of which males and females were 20,434 and 17,735. This child population figure of Sonbhadra district is 12.16% of total urban population.there are 11.7% urban people belong to scheduled casts and 3.2% urban people belong to scheduled tribes.

Average literacy rate in Sonbhadra Urban as per census 2011 is 84.31% of which males and females are 90.73% and 76.93% literates respectively.

Notable people
Politicians
Ram Shakal
Lalchandra
Bhai Lal
Chhotelal
Pakaudi Lal Kol
Artists 
Vivek Mushran Bollywood actor 
Anurag Kashyap Film director
Abhinav Kashyap Film director
Saumya Mishra  Indian Idol season 9 contestant (Singer) 
Vartika Jha Dancer, Choreographer and Actress, second runner up of Dance Plus (season 4)
Mohammed Hanif Khan Shastri Indian Sanskrit Scholar The Government of India awarded him fourth highest civilian award Padma Shri (Literature & Education) in 2019

References

External links

 

 
Coal mining districts in India
Districts of Uttar Pradesh